The men's javelin throw event at the 2009 European Athletics U23 Championships was held in Kaunas, Lithuania, at S. Dariaus ir S. Girėno stadionas (Darius and Girėnas Stadium) on 16 and 18 July.

Medalists

Results

Final
18 July

Qualifications
16 July
Qualifying 76.00 or 12 best to the Final

Group A

Group B

Participation
According to an unofficial count, 30 athletes from 19 countries participated in the event.

 (1)
 (1)
 (1)
 (3)
 (3)
 (2)
 (1)
 (2)
 (1)
 (1)
 (3)
 (1)
 (1)
 (3)
 (1)
 (1)
 (2)
 (1)
 (1)

References

Javelin throw
Javelin throw at the European Athletics U23 Championships